Luxembourg competed at the 1980 Summer Olympics in Moscow, USSR. In partial support of the American-led boycott of the 1980 Summer Olympics, Luxembourg competed under the Olympic Flag instead of its national flag.

Results by event

Archery
After not competing in archery in 1976, Luxembourg returned to the sport in 1980 with one competitor.

Men's Individual Competition:
 Andre Braun - 2386 points (→ 16th place)

Athletics
Men's 20 km Walk
 Lucien Faber
 Final — did not finish (→ no ranking)

Shooting
50 metre rifle three positions
 Roland Jacoby - 34th place

50 metre rifle prone
 Roland Jacoby - 11th place

Nations at the 1980 Summer Olympics
1980
1980 in Luxembourgian sport